Pablo Guzman (born ) is an Argentine male volleyball player. He is part of the Argentina men's national volleyball team. At club level he plays for Lomas Volley.

References

External links
 profile at FIVB.org
 

1988 births
Living people
Argentine men's volleyball players
Place of birth missing (living people)
21st-century Argentine people